Short & Shivery, also known as Short & Shivery: Thirty Chilling Tales, is a series of scary short-story children's books, published between 1987 and 1998 and written by author Robert D. San Souci. The anthology series spawned several sequels throughout an 11-year span. Each book contained 30 tales from America and around the world, including classics by various famous authors throughout history.

Overview
Selected from international ghost folklore, each volume contains 30 stories, specifically retold by author Robert D. San Souci for younger readers. Each book contains a mixture of classic and contemporary tales, including several American classics, all accompanied by illustrations by Katherine Coville and Jacqueline Rogers. It includes stories by the Brothers Grimm, Nathaniel Hawthorne, Washington Irving and Charles Dickens.

The series produced several sequels and were later collected into a compilation book, Giant Short & Shivery. Audiobook versions of the first three volumes have since been released on cassette and compact disc, narrated by Mark Hammer.

School Library Journal called the series "an absolute delight ... Young readers will gobble up these thirty thrilling snacks and beg for more".

Books

See also
 Robert D. San Souci
 Dare to Be Scared
 Yearling Books
 Scary Stories to Tell in the Dark
 Scary Stories for Sleep-overs
 Tales for the Midnight Hour

References 

Series of children's books
Horror short story collections